Karmøens Tidende was a Norwegian newspaper, published in Karmøy in Rogaland county.

Karmøens Tidende was started in 1904. It went defunct in 1916.

References

1904 establishments in Norway
1916 disestablishments in Norway
Defunct newspapers published in Norway
Mass media in Karmøy
Norwegian-language newspapers
Newspapers published in Norway
Publications established in 1904
Publications disestablished in 1916